Nicholas Lyzarde (died April 1571) was an English sergeant-painter.

Biography
Lyzarde served as painter to the court in the time of Henry VIII, and as second painter under Anthony Toto to Edward VI and Mary. By the latter he was appointed sergeant-painter, with a fee of £10. a year levied on the customs. In 1556 he presented the queen on New-year's day with "a table painted with a maundy." He was continued in his place by Elizabeth, and in 1558 presented her on New-year's day "a table painted of the history of Ashuerus," receiving a gilt cruise in return. Lyzarde died in April 1571, and was buried on 5 April in the church of St Martin-in-the-Fields, London. In his will, dated 14 February 1570–1, he mentions five sons and four daughters, and also his wife Margaret.

References

Year of birth unknown
1571 deaths
16th-century English painters
English male painters